Alina Reyes (born Aline Patricia Nardone on 9 February 1956) is a French writer, best known for her literary treatment of eroticism.

Biography
She was born at Bruges, Gironde. Originally a freelance journalist, she devoted herself to fiction after a stay in Montreal.  Reyes acquired notoriety with the success of her first novel, The Butcher, which was translated into numerous languages and adapted for the theatre; like many of her subsequent novels and essays, it showed a concern with contemporary eroticism and how to treat it in literary fiction.

She now splits her time between Paris and the Pyrenees.

Selected works

 Le Boucher, 1988 (The Butcher)
 Lucie au Long Cours, 1990 (Lucie's Long Voyage)
 Au Corset qui Tue, 1992 (The Fatal Bodice)
 Quand tu Aimes, il Faut Partir, 1993 (When You Love You Must Depart)
 Derrière la Porte, 1994 (Behind Closed Doors)
 Satisfaction, 2002 (Satisfaction)
 Politique de l'Amour (Politics of Love)
 La séptima noche, 2004 (La septiéme nuit)
 El cuaderno de Rosa, 2007 (Le carnet de Rose)

External links
French blog of the author : "Le Journal d'Alina Reyes"

1956 births
Living people
20th-century French non-fiction writers
French erotica writers
20th-century French women writers
Women erotica writers